The Bayer designation Zeta Antliae (ζ Ant, ζ Antliae) is shared by two star systems in the constellation Antlia:
 ζ¹ Antliae (HD 82383/82384.)
 ζ² Antliae (HD 82513.)
They are separated by 0.17° on the sky.

Antliae, Zeta
Antlia